Otfried Cheong (formerly Otfried Schwarzkopf) is a German computational geometer working in South Korea at KAIST. He is known as one of the authors of the widely used computational geometry textbook Computational Geometry: Algorithms and Applications (with Mark de Berg, Marc van Kreveld, and Mark Overmars) and as the developer of Ipe, a vector graphics editor.

Cheong completed his doctorate from the Free University of Berlin in 1992 under the supervision of Helmut Alt.
He joined KAIST in 2005, after previously holding positions at Utrecht University, Pohang University of Science and Technology, Hong Kong University of Science and Technology, and the Eindhoven University of Technology. Cheong was co-chair of the Symposium on Computational Geometry in 2006, with Nina Amenta.
In 2017 he was recognized by the Association for Computing Machinery as a Distinguished Scientist.

References

External links

Home page

German computer scientists
20th-century German mathematicians
South Korean computer scientists
21st-century South Korean mathematicians
South Korean people of German descent
Researchers in geometric algorithms
Living people
Year of birth missing (living people)
21st-century German mathematicians